Mary Amelia Cecil, Marchioness of Salisbury (16 August 1750 – 22 November 1835), known as Emily Mary Cecil, was an English aristocrat, Tory political hostess and sportswoman.

The marchioness's eccentricity was frequently remarked upon, in particular her style of dress; her clothes were often of her own design.

Early life
Emily Cecil was born in Dublin as Mary Amelia Hill, the daughter of Wills Hill, 2nd Viscount Hillsborough (later the first Marquess of Downshire), and his first wife, Margaretta Fitzgerald (1729–1766), sister of James FitzGerald, 1st Duke of Leinster. Her father was the Secretary of State for the Colonies under Lord North from 1768 to 1772, a critical period leading toward the American War of Independence.

Life

Emily married James Cecil, Viscount Cranborne, the heir of James Cecil, 6th Earl of Salisbury, on 2 December 1773. After marriage, she became a prominent political hostess of the Tory party. Unusually for a woman at the time, she not only took part in the sport of fox hunting but also became the first Englishwoman to serve as a Master of Foxhounds, taking over the command of the Hatfield Hunt from her husband in 1775.

Children
The couple had four children:
Lady Georgiana Charlotte Augusta Cecil (d. 1860), married Henry Wellesley, 1st Baron Cowley
Lady Emily Anne Bennet Elizabeth Cecil (d. 1858), married George Nugent, 1st Marquess of Westmeath and had issue
Caroline Cecil, died young
James Brownlow William Gascoyne-Cecil, 2nd Marquess of Salisbury (1791–1868)

Death
Following her husband's death, Lady Salisbury continued to live with her son and grandchildren at Hatfield House, Hertfordshire, where she died in a fire on 27 November 1835 at the age of eighty-five. It was thought that feathers in her hat caught alight when she was at her writing-desk and caused the conflagration. The fire destroyed the west wing of the house and only a few bones of hers were found.

References

Salisbury
English political hostesses
1750 births
1835 deaths
Deaths from fire
Emily
Daughters of British marquesses
Wives of knights
Masters of foxhounds in England